Jorge Pascual Medina (born 9 April 2003) is a Spanish footballer who plays as a striker for Villarreal C.

Club career
Pascual is a youth product of CD Oriente and Almería, and followed that up with various back and forth stints between CD Roda and Villarreal. He began his senior career with Villarreal C in the Tercera División, but had his development delayed by a sprained knee in 2022. On 23 February 2023, he signed a professional contract with the senior Villarreal side until 2026. He made his professional debut with Villarreal in a 1–1 UEFA Europa Conference League tie with Anderlecht on 9 March 2023.

International career
Pascual is a youth international for Spain, having played for the Spain U16s in 2019. He has most recently been called up to the Spain U19s in January 2022.

Playing style
Pascual is a left-footed striker who helps create a lot of goals. He positions himself well, is strong and shoots powerfully. He is able to shoot well with both feet and has a good header.

References

External links

2003 births
Living people
Footballers from Almería
Spanish footballers
Spain youth international footballers
Association football defenders
Tercera División players
Villarreal CF C players
Villarreal CF B players
Villarreal CF players